Geneva Smitherman is a University Distinguished Professor Emerita of English and co-founder of the African American and African Studies doctoral program at Michigan State University.  Smitherman co-founded the first public African-centered elementary school in the country Malcolm X Academy within the Detroit Public Schools. She is also known as "Dr. G" and "Dr. Smitherman".

Biography

The oldest of seven children in Brownsville, Tennessee, Smitherman started her education in a one-room schoolhouse. Her family moved from the rural south to the urban north as part of the Great African American migration, first living in Chicago for a few years and then moving to Detroit.  She studied at and graduated from Detroit's Cass Technical High School  and earned a B.A. and M.A. in English and Latin from Wayne State University and a PhD in English, with a specialization in sociolinguistics and education, from the University of Michigan.

Professional accomplishments
In 1971, she was among the original faculty members of Harvard University's “Afro-American Studies”. In addition to working at Michigan State University in the Department of English and co-founding MSU's African American and African Studies, Smitherman has been active in advocating for African American children's education.

In the late 1970s, she worked as an expert witness and advocate in the federal court case, Martin Luther King Junior Elementary School Children et al. v. Ann Arbor School District. A key claim in the Ann Arbor Decision recognized Black English as a language and established that the Ann Arbor School District violated federal statutory law because it failed to take into account this home language in the provision of education.  The judge ordered the school district to find a way to identify Black English speakers in the schools and to "use that knowledge in teaching such students how to read standard English".

Smitherman’s book, Talkin and Testifyin: The Language of Black America, published in 1977, contributed to shifting public and academic perspectives towards the value of African-American Vernacular English (AAVE). This work has been widely referenced by teachers, legal scholars, sociologists, and policy analysts.

In 1991, Smitherman, Clifford Watson, and many Detroit parents established the Malcolm X Academy, an African-centered, predominantly male, Pre-K-8 school within the Detroit Public Schools. It was the first public African-centered elementary school in the country.

Smitherman is author and editor/co-editor of 15 books and monographs and over 125 articles, essays, and published opinion pieces.

Awards and achievements

 1999 CCCC Exemplar Award
 2001 NCTE David H. Russell Research Award for Talkin That Talk: Language, Culture and Education in African America
 2005 NCTE James R. Squire Award (only the tenth recipient of this Award, established in 1967 to recognize a scholar who has had a “transforming influence” and has made a “lasting intellectual contribution” to the field of English Studies)
 Educational Press Association Award for Excellence in Educational Journalism for her English Journal column, "Soul N Style"

Publications
 Talkin and Testifyin: The Language of Black America (1977, 1986)
Black Talk: Words and Phrases from the Hood to the Amen Corner (1994, 2000)
"The Chain Remain the Same": Communicative Practices in the Hip Hop Nation," Journal of Black Studies, 28.1 (Sep., 1997), pp. 3-25.
"CCCC’s Role in the Struggle for Language Rights," College Composition and Communication (February 1999)
 Talkin That Talk: Language, Culture and Education in African America (2000)
"Language and Democracy in the United States of America and South Africa," in Language and Institutions in Africa (eds., Sinfree Makoni and Nkonko Kamwangamalu, 2001)
 Black Linguistics: Language, Society, and Politics in Africa and the Americas (co-editor with Arnetha Ball, Sinfree Makoni, and Arthur K Spears, 2003)
Language Diversity in the Classroom: From Intention to Practice (co-editor with Victor Villanueva, 2003)
 Word from the Mother: Language and African Americans (2006)
Articulate While Black: Barack Obama, Language, and Race in the U.S. (co-author with H. Samy Alim, 2012)

References

External links
 "The Contributions of Geneva Smitherman – Geneva Smitherman, a Catalyst for a Language". (archived from CompPile's CompFAQs)

Living people
Michigan State University faculty
Date of birth missing (living people)
Place of birth missing (living people)
University of Michigan alumni
Wayne State University alumni
Year of birth missing (living people)